Germán Carlos Garavano (born October 23, 1969) is an Argentine lawyer and expert on judicial reform, and the former minister of Justice and Human Rights of Argentina between 2015 and 2019. He was Attorney General of the city of Buenos Aires between 2007 and 2014 and substitute Councillor of the Council of Magistracy of Argentina.

Career 

Germán Garavano was born in 1969 in Buenos Aires. At the age of 18, he enrolled at the Pontifical Catholic University of Argentina to study law, graduating in 1994.

Simultaneously, he began his career at the federal criminal courts of Argentina, reaching the status of clerk of the court after years of several promotions.

He completed postgraduate studies at the Laws and Economics Institute of the Complutense University of Madrid, Spain, as well as at the United Kingdom, where he was invited by the Foreign and Commonwealth Office and the British Council.

Before Garavano was appointed Attorney General of the city of Buenos Aires in 2007, he performed as Counselor of the Council of Magistracy of the city of Buenos Aires and judge at the Criminal Court No. 12 of the city. He was also elected vice-president of the Board of Trustees of Justice Studies Center of the Americas (CEJA-JSCA), chosen for this position by the General Assembly of the Organization of American States (OAS), proposed by the Argentine government.

In 2008, Garavano encouraged the creation of the Criminal Investigation Squad at the General Secretariat of Criminal Policies and Strategic Planning of the Buenos Aires Attorney General's Office.

In 2014 he was elected substitute Counsillor of Argentina's Council of Magistracy on representation of the lawyers of Buenos Aires, sharing the 4-year term with Adriana Donato.

He has written fifteen books and numerous articles on Law and judicial reform, some of which have received awards. Starting in April 2014, he also performed as the academic director of the non-governmental organization Unidos Por la Justicia. Regarding his personal life, Garavano is married and has three sons.

As Minister of Justice and Human Rights of Argentina, he was the promoter of a profound judicial reform program named 'Justicia 2020' ('Justice 2020'). The reform involves median and long term measures that aim at transforming the Argentine justice system. Justicia 2020 promotes a modern and transparent administration of justice, in accordance with the New World Agenda of Sustainable Development of United Nations. Among the initiatives promoted in the program, there are reforms that seek to modernise procedures and create new especializad courts to facilitate investigation. The program was prized by the OECD and the Open Government Partnership in 2019.

During his term as Minister, the United States declassified secret files about the so-called National Reorganization Process and gave them to Argentina's government. Garavano received around 50,000 digitalized pages of documents.

In 2018, when Italy's president Sergio Mattarella visited Argentina, he awarded Garavano with the Order of the Star of Italy.

References

External links 
 Official Site
 General Attorney Office of Buenos Aires City
 unidosjusticia.org
 Justicia 2020 website 

Ministers of Justice of Argentina
20th-century Argentine lawyers
Living people
Lawyers from Buenos Aires
1969 births
Pontifical Catholic University of Argentina alumni
Complutense University of Madrid alumni
21st-century Argentine lawyers